RTÉ Player is an on demand video service provided by Irish public media broadcaster RTÉ.

The service provides live and recorded RTÉ television programmes, and content exclusive to the player as well as content from other international broadcasters.

The player is available in two formats: one for the Republic of Ireland and Northern Ireland, and another for international audiences. The service provides news, current affairs, entertainment, sport, local and international dramas, and allows viewers to watch programmes from 7 to 21 days after they are broadcast.

History
RTÉ Player was launched on 21 April 2009.

On 2 September 2011, RTÉ announced it would launch a similar platform of its digital radio stations under the name "RTÉ Radio Player".

RTÉ Player was made available to Virgin Media Ireland (previously UPC Ireland) customers through their televisions from 25 May 2012. The service became available to all Sky Ireland customers on 8 July 2016.

In December 2018, a new HTML5 version of the RTÉ Player was revealed featuring content which is exclusive to the online player. The player also hosts additional channels including RTÉ Archives and RTÉ Food. The on-demand service also features content from international broadcasters such as CBS, ABC Australia, arte, Epix, Lionsgate Television and Warner Brothers Television.

Content
More than 200 hours of programmes from all categories of RTÉ broadcast schedule are available on RTÉ Player, most of which are not available to web users outside the island of Ireland. But in January 2010, news, sport and flagship entertainment programming were released to worldwide audiences. According to RTÉ, it is "one of the first broadcasters in the world to launch a comprehensive international online TV catch-up service."

Popular soap operas are available on a 7-day catch-up basis, while home produced entertainment and children's programming is available for 21 days. All RTÉ News and Current Affairs output and RTÉ Sport shows including The Sunday Game, Monday Night Soccer and OB Sport are available.

In late 2009, RTÉ began putting more and more international programming on RTÉ Player. When initially launched RTÉ had already secured rights for online streaming for many British and Australian shows such as EastEnders and Home and Away. They then launched some American programmes with exclusive online showings of Seasons 1 and 2 of AMC's Mad Men. Other US shows soon followed such as Grey's Anatomy, Ugly Betty, Lost, Desperate Housewives, and Blue Bloods.

On 14 December 2010, RTÉ Player became available on Sony's PlayStation 3 (PS3) and PSP console.

An app for iPhone and iPad was launched on 22 December 2011. Despite all programs being available on Android via Adobe Flash, only a small selection of programs are available on the iPhone and iPad app.

As part of TV50, RTÉ intends to launch as many as 20 archive programmes each month of 2012 via the RTÉ Player.

RTÉ Player International

On 4 March 2015 RTÉ revamped its RTÉ Player for international audiences. 
The new service provides over 500 hours of television from Ireland. RTÉ Player International will be a ‘freemium’ offering which means that audiences will be able to download the app for free and access 100 hours of free content, refreshed daily. The full content offering can be accessed and watched free of advertising for a monthly subscription of €8.99 ($8.99/ £6.99) through the App Store. This subscription helps to cover the cost of securing the international rights for the content and for delivering this premium quality video-on-demand service. The new enhanced RTÉ Player International service is available for iOS devices, supporting iOS7 or greater. The original RTÉ Player service for international audiences remains available on desktop and android.

Criticism
In 2019, the service came in for criticism for being unreliable and difficult to operate. A freedom of information request in late 2019 revealed that RTÉ received a series of complaints from the public that showed that while commercials seemed to work very well that the actual content frequently didn't play. RTÉ's response to TheJournal.ie stated that the vast majority of people were happy even though they did not state how they knew people were satisfied with the service. TheJournal.ie reported one year later in 2020 that viewers described the service as "an embarrassment", "ridiculous", and the "worst streaming app I've ever used", while RTÉ said it was striving to improve RTÉ Player.

See also
 List of programmes broadcast by RTÉ
 List of streaming media services

References

External links 
  – official site

2009 establishments in Ireland
2009 in Irish television
2010s in Irish television
Media players
Player
Player
Video on demand services